In chemistry, the mass fraction of a substance within a mixture is the ratio   (alternatively denoted ) of the mass  of that substance to the total mass  of the mixture. Expressed as a formula, the mass fraction is:

 

 

Mass fraction can also be expressed, with a denominator of 100, as percentage by mass (in commercial contexts often called percentage by weight, abbreviated wt%; see mass versus weight). It is one way of expressing the composition of a mixture in a dimensionless size; mole fraction (percentage by moles, mol%) and volume fraction (percentage by volume, vol%) are others.

When the prevalences of interest are those of individual chemical elements, rather than of compounds or other substances, the term mass fraction can also refer to the ratio of the mass of an element to the total mass of a sample. In these contexts an alternative term is mass percent composition. The mass fraction of an element in a compound can be calculated from the compound's empirical formula or its chemical formula.

Terminology

Percent concentration does not refer to this quantity. This improper name persists, especially in elementary textbooks. In biology, the unit "%" is sometimes (incorrectly) used to denote mass concentration, also called mass/volume percentage. A solution with 1g of solute dissolved in a final volume of 100mL of solution would be labeled as "1%" or "1% m/v" (mass/volume). This is incorrect because the unit "%" can only be used for dimensionless quantities. Instead, the concentration should simply be given in units of g/mL. Percent solution or percentage solution are thus terms best reserved for mass percent solutions (m/m, m%, or mass solute/mass total solution after mixing), or volume percent solutions (v/v, v%, or volume solute per volume of total solution after mixing). The very ambiguous terms percent solution and percentage solutions with no other qualifiers continue to occasionally be encountered.

In thermal engineering, vapor quality is used for the mass fraction of vapor in the steam.

In alloys, especially those of noble metals, the term fineness is used for the mass fraction of the noble metal in the alloy.

Properties
The mass fraction is independent of temperature until phase change occurs.

Related quantities

Mixing ratio 
The mixing of two pure components can be expressed introducing the (mass) mixing ratio of them . Then the mass fractions of the components will be

 

The mass ratio equals the ratio of mass fractions of components:

 

due to division of both numerator and denominator by the sum of masses of components.

Mass concentration
The mass fraction of a component in a solution is the ratio of the mass concentration of that component ρi (density of that component in the mixture) to the density of solution .

Molar concentration
The relation to molar concentration is like that from above substituting the relation between mass and molar concentration:

 

Mass percentage
Mass percentage is defined as the mass fraction multiplied by 100.

Mole fraction
The mole fraction  can be calculated using the formula

 

Replacing the expression of the molar-mass products,

Spatial variation and gradient

In a spatially non-uniform mixture, the mass fraction gradient gives rise to the phenomenon of diffusion.

See also
 Mass-flux fraction

References

Chemical properties
Dimensionless numbers of chemistry
Combustion